"Hammer Horror" is a song by Kate Bush, released as first single from her second album Lionheart. It was released on 27 October 1978. The song peaked at No. 44 on the UK Singles Chart. The parent album, released a few weeks later, was unaffected and charted in the top 10. "Hammer Horror" proved to be a temporary blip, for Bush's next single returned her to the top 20. In other countries it fared better, such as Ireland and Australia, where the song  reached No. 10  and No.17 respectively.

Whilst in Australia during a promotional tour, Kate Bush devised the dance routine for the song in her Melbourne hotel room, and performed the song on the television show Countdown.

The song references Hammer Films, a company specializing in horror movies. However, Bush conceived of the song after viewing the film Man of a Thousand Faces, a biographical film – not produced by Hammer – about Lon Chaney starring James Cagney. "The song was inspired by seeing James Cagney playing the part of Lon Chaney playing the hunchback", Bush stated in 1979. "He was an actor in an actor in an actor, rather like Chinese boxes, and that's what I was trying to create." The story of the song concerns an actor who gets thrust into the lead role of The Hunchback of Notre Dame after the original actor dies in an accident on the film set. The guilt-ridden narrator of the song ends up being haunted by the ghost of the jealous original actor, who was a former friend. A promotional video was made for the single featuring Bush and a black-masked dancer performing the song against a black background.

The B-side of the song was "Coffee Homeground", which also featured on Lionheart.

Track listing
All tracks written and composed by Kate Bush.

7" vinyl
 "Hammer Horror" – 4:38
 "Coffee Homeground" – 3:39

7" vinyl (Japan)
 "Hammer Horror" – 4:15
 "Coffee Homeground" – 3:39

Personnel

Musicians
Stuart Elliot – drums, percussion
Del Palmer – bass ("Hammer Horror")
David Paton – bass ("Coffee Homeground")
Kate Bush – vocals, harmony vocals, piano
Ian Bairnson – electric and acoustic guitar ("Hammer Horror"), rhythm guitar ("Coffee Homeground")
Duncan Mackay – synthesizer
Andrew Powell – harmonium ("Hammer Horror")

Production
Andrew Powell – producer
Kate Bush – assistant producer
Patrick Jaunead – assistant engineer
David Katz – orchestra contractor
Jon Kelly – recording engineer
Nigel Walker – assistant engineer, mixing, mixing assistant

Charts

References

1978 singles
1978 songs
EMI Records singles
Hammer Film Productions
Kate Bush songs
Song recordings produced by Andrew Powell
Songs about ghosts
Songs written by Kate Bush
Works based on The Hunchback of Notre-Dame